Upper Montclair Country Club is an A. W. Tillinghast designed golf course located in Clifton, New Jersey.

History 
The original 18-hole golf course and a brand new Clubhouse opened in 1928. In 1954 Robert Trent Jones Sr. led major course renovation transforming Upper Montclair Country Club into the present 27-hole Championship design. In 2000 the club hired Roger Rulewich to complete a course renovation project that included installing state of the art drainage and irrigation system, while reshaping and restoring all of the bunkers throughout the 27 hole facility.

Upper Montclair has also appeared in some episodes of The Sopranos.

Notable professional events

References

1901 establishments in New Jersey
Clifton, New Jersey
Golf clubs and courses in New Jersey
Sports organizations established in 1901
Golf clubs and courses designed by A. W. Tillinghast